Eupithecia stueningi is a moth in the family Geometridae that is endemic to Thailand.

The forewings are brownish grey and the hindwings are whitish grey.

References

Moths described in 2009
Endemic fauna of Thailand
Moths of Asia
stueningi